Harold Bounsall (5 September 1897 – 19 May 1978) was a Canadian cyclist. He competed in five events at the 1920 Summer Olympics.

References

External links
 

1897 births
1978 deaths
Canadian male cyclists
Olympic cyclists of Canada
Cyclists from Ontario
Cyclists at the 1920 Summer Olympics
Sportspeople from Toronto